Deep Breath may refer to:
 Deep Breath (film), a 2003 Iranian film
 "Deep Breath" (Doctor Who), an episode of Doctor Who